The 2014 Malaysia Cup Final was a football match which was played on 1 November 2014, to determine the winners of the 2014 Malaysia Cup. It was the final of the 88th edition of the Malaysia Cup, competition organised by the Football Association of Malaysia.

The final was played between Johor Darul Takzim and Pahang.

Venue
The final was held at the Bukit Jalil National Stadium in Kuala Lumpur.

Road to final

Match details

Winners

References

External links
FAM Official website

Malaysia Cup seasons
2014 in Malaysian football